Eudonia crypsinoa is a moth in the family Crambidae. It was named by Edward Meyrick in 1884. It is endemic to New Zealand.

The wingspan is 23–24 mm. The forewings are light ochreous-grey, irrorated with white. The hindwings are grey-whitish. Adults have been recorded on wing in December and January.

References

Moths described in 1884
Eudonia
Endemic fauna of New Zealand
Moths of New Zealand
Taxa named by Edward Meyrick
Endemic moths of New Zealand